The Briggait is a category A listed building in Glasgow, Scotland, situated in the Merchant City area on the Bridgegate (A8) and Clyde Street (A814) just north of the River Clyde. Construction of the building was completed in 1873.

History
The building was originally used as Glasgow's fish market until the late 1970s. It was then converted into a shopping centre during the 1980s – this proved to be a temporary venture. In the 21st century it was converted into artists studios which opened to the public in August 2010.

The incorporated steeple, which dates back to 1659 as part of the Merchants' House trade body headquarters (they later moved to new premises at George Square) and is a Category A listed structure in its own right, has been restored.

References

Category A listed buildings in Glasgow
Tourist attractions in Glasgow
Wrestling venues
Art venues
Buildings and structures completed in 1873
1873 establishments in Scotland
Fish markets
Clock towers in the United Kingdom